Cortinarius orellanus, commonly known as the  fool's webcap or fools webcap, is a species of deadly fungus in the family Cortinariaceae native to Europe. Within the genus it belongs to a group known as the Orellani, all of which are highly toxic—eating them results in kidney failure, which is often irreversible. The mushroom is generally tan to brown all over.

Taxonomy
Cortinarius orellanus was first described by Swedish mycologist Elias Magnus Fries in his 1838 book Epicrisis Systematis Mycologici seu Synopsis Hymenomycetum. It is one of seven highly toxic species that make up the orellani, a subgenus within genus Cortinarius.

Description
The cap flattens with age. In colour, it is an orange-brown, and is covered in fine, fibrous scales but become smooth with age. The cap surface turns black with potassium hydroxide. The thick gills are light ochre-coloured, changing to a rust-brown with age as the spores mature. They have an adnate or sinuate connection to the stipe. It is the same colour or slightly paler than the cap, and is yellowish at the top. There are occasionally fragments of the pale yellow veil (cortina) attached to its lower half. The firm flesh is pale ochre. It smells slightly of radishes when cut and has no strong taste.

Distribution and habitat
Cortinarius orellanus occurs in central and eastern Europe (Poland, Czech Republic, Slovakia), though is rare in Germany. It is occasionally found in southern Britain. It grows in deciduous forests under beech, hornbeam and oak, often near pine trees.

Toxicity
The danger of C. orellanus was uncovered in 1957, after (in 1952) 102 people fell ill after eating it in Bydgoszcz, Poland. Eleven of the victims died. Since then, cases of poisoning have been recorded in France, Switzerland, and Germany. In 1997, four people suffered renal toxicity after mistaking C. orellanus for the edible and prized chanterelle in Austria, where wild mushroom picking is popular.

The relevant toxin is orellanine.

See also
 List of deadly fungus species

References

External links
 

Fungi of Europe
orellanus
Deadly fungi
Fungi described in 1838
Taxa named by Elias Magnus Fries